Nikola Čolić (born 17 August 2002) is a Serbian footballer who plays as a midfielder for FK Čukarički in the Serbian SuperLiga.

Career

Partizan
After progressing through the club's youth system, Čolić signed his first professional contract with Partizan in May 2020. He made his professional debut for the club on 1 August 2020, coming on as a second-half substitute and scoring late in a 3–1 victory over Napredak.

References

External links

2002 births
Living people
Footballers from Belgrade
FK Teleoptik players
FK Partizan players
FK Čukarički players
Serbian SuperLiga players
Serbian footballers
Serbia youth international footballers
Association football midfielders